The first season of Baldwin Hills premiered on July 10, 2007 and concluded on August 28, 2007.

Cast
The following is a list of cast members for the 1st season.

  Main Cast Member
  Secondary Cast Member

Episodes

References

2007 American television seasons